Ghazi Amanullah Khan Town is a planned community located next to the Kabul–Jalalabad Road roughly  southeast of Jalalabad in Nangarhar Province of Afghanistan.

The town is named after Amanullah Khan, who was the modernizing Emir of Afghanistan from 1919 to 1929. His mausoleum is in the city of Jalalabad.

The developers are the importing and distribution company Najeeb Zarab Limited. Construction began on vacant land in 2008 and is ongoing. Whenever the town is complete it will include shops, mosques, schools, parks and canals, all connected by broad tree-lined streets.

The developers set aside land for the construction of Ghazi Amanullah International Cricket Stadium, which now hosts regular cricket matches.

See also 
Nangarhar Province

References

External links
 Ghazi Amanullah Khan City Nangarhar website 
 
 

Populated places in Nangarhar Province
Planned cities